Occidental College (informally Oxy) is a private liberal arts college in Los Angeles, California. Founded in 1887 as a coeducational college by clergy and members of the Presbyterian Church, it became non-sectarian in 1910. It is one of the oldest liberal arts colleges on the West Coast of the United States.

Occidental's current  campus is located in Eagle Rock, Los Angeles, and was designed by architect Myron Hunt. Due to its proximity to Hollywood and its architecture, the campus is frequently used as a filming location for film and television productions. Occidental is a founding member of the Southern California Intercollegiate Athletic Conference and its 20 varsity sports teams compete in NCAA Division III. The college's curriculum emphasizes diversity, global literacy, and civic engagement.

Notable alumni include a President of the United States (Barack Obama), a Cabinet member, several members of the United States Congress, CEOs of notable companies, 10 Rhodes Scholars, and recipients of the Nobel Prize, Pulitzer Prize, Academy Award, BAFTA Award, and Emmy Award.

History

Early history

Occidental College was founded on April 20, 1887, by a group of Presbyterian clergy, missionaries, and laymen, including James George Bell, Lyman Stewart, and Thomas Bard. The cornerstone of the school's first building was laid in September 1887 in the Boyle Heights now East Los Angeles neighborhood of Los Angeles. The college's first term began a year later with 27 male and 13 female students, and tuition of $50 a year.

In 1896, the Boyle Heights building was destroyed by fire. The college temporarily relocated to the old St. Vincent's College campus on Hill Street before a new site was selected in Highland Park in 1898. Eventually, the college erected three main buildings: the Academy Building, the Stimson Library, and the Hall of Arts and Letters (the Hall still stands today, converted to apartments). The Highland Park site was also bisected by the tracks of the Santa Fe Railroad, and was the site of two presidential visits, first by William Howard Taft in 1909 and subsequently by Theodore Roosevelt in 1911.

In 1909, the Pomona College Board of Trustees suggested a merger between Pomona and Occidental, but the proposal came to nothing. The following year, the college severed formal ties with the Presbyterian Church and became a non-sectarian, non-denominational institution. The small size of the  campus and the disruption caused by frequent freight trains pushed the college's trustees to find a new location.

1900s

In 1912, the school began construction of a new campus located in Los Angeles' Eagle Rock neighborhood. The Eagle Rock campus was designed by noted California architect Myron Hunt, also known as the planner of the California Institute of Technology (Caltech) campus and as designer of the Huntington Library and Art Gallery and the Rose Bowl. That same year, Occidental President John Willis Baer announced the trustees' decision to convert Occidental College into an all-men's institution. The plans were met with widespread backlash from students and faculty who protested the change. The community outcry garnered national headlines and the board later dropped the proposal.

Two weeks after Booker T. Washington came to visit Occidental, on March 27, 1914, Swan, Fowler, and Johnson Halls were dedicated at its new Eagle Rock campus. Patterson Field, today one of the oldest collegiate sports stadiums in Los Angeles, was opened in 1916. In April 1917, shortly after the United States entered World War I, the college formed a Students Army Training Corps to aid the war effort.

Under Occidental President Remsen Bird, the school opened a series of new Hunt-designed buildings, including Clapp Library (1924), Hillside Theatre and a women's dormitory (Orr Hall) in 1925, Alumni Gymnasium (1926), the Freeman Student Union (1928) and a music and speech building (1929). The Delta of California chapter of Phi Beta Kappa was established at Occidental in 1926, at a time when the only other chapters in California were at Stanford, UC Berkeley, and Pomona.
 
English novelist Aldous Huxley, who had spoken at Occidental's convocation ceremony in the then-new Thorne Hall in 1938, lampooned President Remsen Bird as Dr. Herbert Mulge of Tarzana College in his 1939 novel, After Many a Summer Dies the Swan. Huxley was never again invited back to campus.

During World War II, many students left Occidental to fight in the war. In July 1943, the U.S. Navy established a Navy V-12 officer training program on campus that produced hundreds of graduates before it was disbanded in 1945 at the end of the war. Occidental President Remsen Bird worked behind the scenes to help Oxy students of Japanese descent continue their education despite mandatory evacuation orders; his letters are included in the Japanese American Relocation Collection in Clapp Library.

After having its first Rhodes Scholar, Clarence Spaulding, named in 1908, Oxy seniors John Paden and Aaron Segal were awarded Rhodes Scholarships in 1958, the only time Occidental has produced two Rhodes Scholars in a single year. Paden and Segal were among the ten Occidental students who participated in Crossroads Africa that year, a forerunner to the Peace Corps that later became a national program.

In 1969, 42 students were suspended for peacefully protesting military recruiting on campus. One year later, faculty voted to suspend classes in the wake of the Kent State shootings and America's invasion of Cambodia. Subsequently, Oxy students wrote 7,000 letters to Washington D.C., protesting U.S. involvement in the war in Southeast Asia. Occidental launched one of the country's first Upward Bound programs in 1966, aimed at increasing the number of low-income, underrepresented high school students who become the first in their family to go to college.

Also in 1969, the school opened its first two co-ed dormitories, and two more followed a year later. In 1988, John Brooks Slaughter, formerly Chancellor of the University of Maryland, became Occidental's first black president. Building on faculty and student advocacy and a series of grants the college had received previously to increase the diversity of the Occidental student body, Slaughter led the process of creating a new mission statement that is still used today. Also, Slaughter led the college's community outreach expansion with the creation of the Center for Volunteerism and Community Service, the predecessor for the current Center for Community Based Learning.

In November 1990, the college, initially established as a Presbyterian institution but no longer religiously affiliated, rededicated the campus' main chapel as the Herrick Memorial Chapel and Interfaith Center. The school also took down the crosses in the chapel in an attempt to "broaden Occidental's appeal among non-Christian students."

2000s
In July 2006, Susan Westerberg Prager became Occidental's first female president. She left her position in 2007 during the fall term. Robert Skotheim the former president of Whitman College and the Huntington Library, then served as interim president. In July 2009, Jonathan Veitch, formerly dean of The New School's Eugene Lang College, became Occidental's 15th president, and the first native Angeleno president.

The college received some national scrutiny in 2014 when the U.S. Department of Education named Occidental College as one of 55 higher education institutions under investigation "for possible violations of federal law over the handling of sexual violence and harassment." In response to student and faculty outcry the college adopted a new interim sexual misconduct policy, hired a former assistant district attorney as a full-time, independent Title IX coordinator, and added a new 24-hour, 7-days-a-week telephone hotline. The school also created a permanent Sexual Misconduct Advisory Board made up of students, faculty, and staff. Two years later, the investigation was concluded with the Office of Civil Rights finding that "the preponderance of the evidence does not support a conclusion that the College violated Title IX, except with respect to the issue of promptness in several cases during the 2012-13 school years."

President Barack Obama attended Occidental for two years prior to transferring to Columbia University. In 2015, "birthers" falsely claimed that Obama's Occidental College transcript revealed he received financial aid as a foreign student from Indonesia after the resurgence of a fake news story from 2009.

In July 2020, Harry J. Elam, Jr., formerly vice provost for undergraduate education at Stanford University and renowned for diversity and inclusion initiatives in liberal arts curricula, became Occidental's 16th president.

Campus

Architect Myron Hunt created the original campus master plan for Occidental's Eagle Rock campus in 1911. He structured the campus in a Mediterranean style, with covered walkways and tile roofs. The campus landscape was designed and developed by Beatrix Farrand in the late 1930s. All of the 19 buildings designed by Hunt remain in use today, including Johnson Hall, now the home for the McKinnon Center for Global Affairs.

There are 12 on-campus residence halls and the main dining facility is The Marketplace, which is located in the Johnson Student Center. Some buildings, such as the Hameetman Science Center (designed by Anshen + Allen, 2003), deviates from the original architecture with its large glass windows and metal balconies (its lobby houses a large Foucault pendulum). In 1979, Occidental installed Water Forms II, a kinetic fountain designed by professor George Baker. The fountain is a campus landmark and was featured prominently in the 1984 film Star Trek III: The Search for Spock.

The campus is also noted for its outdoor Remsen Bird Amphitheater, also called the Remsen Bird Hillside Theatre, where between 1960 and 1996, a season of summer plays were performed, including Shakespeare plays and musicals. However, financial cutbacks caused the theater department to end its summer festival programs. Since 1996 the Occidental Children's Theater has instead performed there each summer.

In 1989, the college dedicated Keck Theater, a post-modern theater with a movable stage and seating arrangements for a variety of different types of shows. It was designed by the architectural firm of Kanmnitzer and Cotton. The James Barrie version of the play Peter Pan was the first show performed at the opening ceremony in the summer of 1989.

Occidental College was ranked as the sixth "Most Beautiful" campus by Newsweek in 2012. The campus is home to a 1-megawatt ground-mounted solar array, which is the largest hillside array on an American college campus and the largest of its kind in Los Angeles. The 4,886-panel installation was completed in Spring 2013 and inaugurated on the school's 126-year anniversary.

Academics

There are 40 majors offered on campus (and nine minor-only programs, including Public Health, Linguistics, and Classical Studies) and a 9:1 student–faculty ratio. The average class size is 18 students and most students take four classes per semester. the most popular majors, based on 2021 graduates, were:
Econometrics & Quantitative Economics (46)
Psychology (38)
Biology/Biological Sciences (37)
Political Science & Government (34)
Environmental Studies (31)
International Relations and Affairs (31)

Rankings 

Since 1908, Occidental has graduated 10 Rhodes Scholars. In U.S. News & World Reports 2022 rankings of American liberal arts colleges, Occidental is tied for 37th overall, tied for 33rd in "Best Undergraduate Teaching", 68th for "Best Value," and tied at 70th for "Top Performers on Social Mobility." The 2017 edition of the Fiske Guide to Colleges gave Occidental four-star ratings (out of five) in academics and quality of life. Princeton Review's The Best 381 Colleges 2017 Edition gave Occidental ratings of 91 (out of 100) in academics and quality of life and 95 in financial aid. In Forbes 2019 ranking of America's Top Colleges, Occidental ranks 102nd out of 650 liberal arts colleges, universities and service academies.  Kiplinger's "Best College Values 2019" rankings places Occidental 58th among 149 liberal arts colleges.

Admissions 
Fall Admission Statistics

U.S. News deemed Occidental's admissions "more selective," with the class of 2020 acceptance rate being 37.3%. Of those admitted submitting such data, 52% were in the top 10% of their high school class. The SAT 25th - 75th percentile scores were 1810–2120. Of those admitted to the class of 2020, 50% identified as persons of color, and 13% of those admitted were international students.

Core program
Divided in three parts, the Core Program was designed by the faculty of Occidental to unify and enhance the liberal arts education offered by the school. The Core Program requires students to achieve the following:
 complete two first-year seminars (FYS), including a fall course to develop writing skills and a spring course to develop research skills;
 complete a set of culture courses, including: a "US Diversity" course exploring minoritized perspectives of race, religion, ethnicity, class, gender, and/or sexuality; a course on one specific geographical, national, or cultural region of the world outside the U.S; and a "Global Connections" course on the literary, artistic, religious, philological, economic, ecological, ideological, political, social, intellectual, scientific, etc. interactions of at least two nations/regions;
complete a course that focuses on a historical period prior to the 1800s  
complete a course focused on the theory or practice of fine arts
foreign language proficiency through 102-level
 complete three math and science courses; one has to be a lab science
 pass a senior-year comprehensive examination within the student's chosen major.

First-year seminars (eight course credits in total) are the centerpiece of the Core Program. Students are given a variety of class choices to fulfill the seminar requirement and to satisfy the first-year writing requirement. The classes are designed to expose students to the rigor of college academics and to the four principles of the college mission—Excellence, Equity, Community, and Service.

The final portion of the Core Program requires students to pass a senior comprehensive examination in their chosen field. Comprehensive projects most often take the form of a senior thesis, but in some departments they are an examination, research presentation, creative project (such as a film, theatrical production, composition, etc.), or community-based project.

Exchange and cooperative joint degree programs

California Institute of Technology and Columbia University
Students at Occidental can take courses at the California Institute of Technology (Caltech) in nearby Pasadena free of charge. In addition, a 3-2 engineering program allows qualified students the opportunity to study at Occidental for three years, completing their undergraduate experience with an additional two years either at Caltech or Columbia University. At the end of the five years, the student receives two degrees, a Bachelor of Arts in the Combined Plan from Occidental and a Bachelor of Science in the selected field of engineering from the engineering school.

Art Center College of Design
Art majors at Occidental College can take courses at the Art Center College of Design in Pasadena, one of the country's top-ranked art schools. The program is not open to first-year students, but as with the Caltech exchange program, students receive full course credit. No additional tuition payments are required.

Columbia University School of Law
With a competitive GPA and LSAT scores, Columbia Law School admits students upon completion of their junior year at Occidental into its Accelerated Interdisciplinary Program in Legal Education. Admittance to the program enables students to earn a bachelor's degree from Occidental and a Juris Doctor (law) degree from Columbia in six years.

Keck Graduate Institute
Students who are interested in biotechnology and who become a biochemistry major maintaining a 3.2 GPA in the necessary courses will be guaranteed admission to the Keck master's in bioscience program. The Keck Graduate Institute is part of the Claremont Colleges consortium.

Student life

At the beginning of every school year, freshmen participate in convocation, a formal ceremony welcoming new students to the college in which the faculty wear their full academic regalia and students don robes. Founders Day is celebrated annually at the school on April 20, the day in 1887 when Occidental's incorporation papers were officially signed by the California Secretary of State.

For the first three years at Occidental, all students are guaranteed housing on campus and for seniors it is optional. Freshmen do not get to choose where they live; the Office of Residential Education & Housing Services arranges housing by pairing students based on a short form students fill in the summer before they arrive on campus. The Occidental College dorm life consists of 13 co-ed residential housing facilities.

After a student's first year, he or she can choose to live in a number of dorms that house sophomores, juniors, and seniors; one-third of all these halls are reserved for each grade. These dorms include Newcomb Hall, Wylie Hall, Erdman Hall, Haines Hall, Rangeview Hall and Stearns Hall.

There are also themed-living communities which consist of the Multicultural Hall in Pauley (open to all years), all-women housing (Berkus House, named after alumnus Dave Berkus), Food Justice house, and several communities and support and uplift the experiences of students of color and LGBTQIA students.

Student activities

Occidental College has various student-run clubs, organizations and ventures such as the Green Bean Coffee Lounge, organic garden, and the student-managed bike sharing and repairing program. There are also traditional groups such as glee club, Greek organizations, and student media outlets.

Media
The campus newspaper is The Occidental, an independent, student-run publication. It has been published continuously since 1893. As of the 2019–20 school year, The Occidental publishes biweekly in print and weekly online.

KOXY is a student-run campus radio station, in operation in the 1960s and 1970s, and again since 2000. It originally operated on the frequency 104.7 in and around campus from 1968 to 2009, but switched to only being available by webstream in 2009. KOXY sponsors several on-campus events.

In 2010, Occidental College launched a TV station called CatAList, launched by then-students Daniel Watson and Raffy Cortina; Cortina was also the first Occidental student to be awarded with a Student Academy Award from the Academy of Motion Picture Arts and Sciences for his short Bottled Up. The station produces 20–30 minutes of student-run content weekly on a variety of topics.

Greek life
Occidental College's Greek Council consists of eight members: local sororities Alpha Lambda Phi Alpha, Delta Omicron Tau; local fraternity Zeta Tau Zeta (co-ed), and national fraternity, Sigma Alpha Epsilon. These Greek organizations are social organizations as opposed to academic Greek organizations. Occidental has a fall and a spring Greek recruiting period; first year students are first eligible to participate in Greek recruitment during the spring of their first year. Occidental also has two cultural Greek organizations: Kappa Alpha Psi and Sigma Lambda Gamma. The college is working to expand their roster of Greek organizations by adding Phi Beta Sigma, Delta Sigma Theta, and Zeta Phi Beta.

Local involvement
There are various entities at Occidental College that promote local community involvement opportunities in Eagle Rock, Highland Park and Los Angeles. These include the Urban and Environmental Policy Institute (UEPI), the Office of Community Engagement (OCE), the Center for Community Based Learning (CCBL), the Neighborhood Partnership Program (NPP), and Upward Bound.

Athletics

Occidental is one of the five schools that founded the Southern California Intercollegiate Athletic Conference (SCIAC) in 1915 and is currently a member of the SCIAC and NCAA Division III. Occidental features 21 varsity sports teams and a program of club sports and intramural competition. Approximately 25 percent of the student body participates in a varsity sports program.

During the 2006–2007 athletic season, the Tigers cross country, American football and basketball teams were Southern California Intercollegiate Athletic Conference champions. In 2014, diver Jessica Robson set the Southern California Intercollegiate Athletic Conference records for both 1m and 3m diving. The school's Blackshirts Rugby union team was also league champion for the first time in five years. In 2011, Jeremy Castro ('99) and Patrick Guthrie ('86) steered the squad to a NSCRO final, falling to Longwood University 36–27 in Virginia Beach, Virginia. In addition the college has a dance team that also performs at every home football and basketball game.

Occidental athletics date back to 1894, when the college helped organize the first intercollegiate athletic competition in Southern California. Since then, Oxy has produced more than a dozen Olympians, world-record holders, and national champions, including 1935 national girls' tennis champion Pat Henry Yeomans '38, two-time diving gold medalist Sammy Lee '43, and pole vault silver medalist Bob Gutowski '57.

Occidental has long-standing football rivalries with Pomona College and Whittier College; the Tigers have played both the Sagehens and the Poets over 100 times. In 1982, the Occidental College football team had the rare opportunity for national prominence when, due to the 1982 National Football League strike, their game with San Diego was broadcast on national television. In 2017, Occidental cancelled the remainder of its football season due to lack of healthy players, as few as 30 in some cases. The team forfeited two games and was outscored in the other three 170–19. The Tigers played nine games in 2019, finishing with a 1–8 record. It was the final season for the Tigers football team. The school dropped football in 2020.

In 2011, Occidental College lost a basketball game to Caltech with a score of 46 to 45 giving the Caltech Beavers their first conference win in 26 years and putting an end to their 310-game losing streak.

In 2019, the Occidental Men's Basketball Team reached the SCIAC championship game, ultimately losing to Pomona Pitzer in the Tournament Championship game.

Famous Occidental College Tigers include NFL coach Jim E. Mora, former American Football League Most Valuable Player and politician Jack Kemp, former NFL player Vance Mueller, 2011 U.S. Senior Open Champion Olin Browne, CFL Quarterback Bryan James Scott (Edmonton Football Team) and CFL player Justin Goltz (Winnipeg Blue Bombers).

Notable people 
Notable graduates of Occidental College include filmmaker Terry Gilliam, football player and politician Jack Kemp, pioneering African-American physicist and inventor George Edward Alcorn Jr., former New Orleans Saints and Indianapolis Colts head coach Jim E. Mora, co-inventor of the hard disk drive William Goddard, psychopharmacologist and professor at Johns Hopkins School of Medicine Roland Griffiths, federal judge Jacqueline Nguyen, academic, film executive and novelist August Coppola, historian and chancellor of the California State University system Glenn Dumke, former Lieutenant Governor of California Robert Finch, adventurer and writer Homer Lea, poet Robinson Jeffers, librarian and writer Lawrence Clark Powell, Tony Award-winning actress Joanna Gleason, civil rights activist Ernesto Galarza, television director Jesus Salvador Trevino, voice actress and internet personality Ashly Burch, political scientist Eqbal Ahmad, journalist and current dean of Columbia University Graduate School of Journalism Steve Coll, actor and writer George Nader, veteran executive at Walt Disney Imagineering Joe Rohde, CEO of Warner Music Group Stephen Cooper, President of Catholic University of America Peter Kilpatrick, and Ambassador to Armenia and former chargé d'affaires to Ukraine during the 2022 Russian invasion of Ukraine Kristina Kvien.

Notable alumni who did not graduate from Occidental include the 44th U.S. President Barack Obama, former First Lady of Colorado Dottie Lamm, Academy Award–winning actor and filmmaker Ben Affleck, actor Luke Wilson, filmmaker and actor Cooper Raiff, producer Todd Garner, and actress Emily Osment.

Notable faculty members include the American urban policy analyst Peter Dreier, former U.S. Ambassador to Finland Derek Shearer, former CNN and Fox News contributor Caroline Heldman, chemist Frank L. Lambert, art historian and author Amy Lyford, and the 2005 PEN American Center Literary Award winner in poetry Martha Ronk.

Film and television at Occidental
Occidental's campus, architecture, and proximity to Hollywood have made it a desired location for a number of film and television productions.

Film credits include:

 The Cup of Fury (1920) with Helene Chadwick
The College Hero (1927) with Ben Turpin
 Horse Feathers (1932) with the Marx Brothers
 Pigskin Parade (1936) with Judy Garland and Betty Grable
 Second Chorus (1941) with Fred Astaire
 That Hagen Girl (1947) with Shirley Temple and Ronald Reagan
 Goodbye, My Fancy (1951) with Joan Crawford and Robert Young
 That's My Boy (1951) with Dean Martin
 Pat and Mike (1952) with Katharine Hepburn and Spencer Tracy
 Tall Story (1960) with Jane Fonda and Anthony Perkins
 Take Her, She's Mine (1963) with James Stewart
 The Impossible Years (1968) with David Niven
 The One and Only (1978) with Henry Winkler
 Star Trek III: The Search for Spock (1984) featuring the Gilman Fountain as part of the Palace of Vulcan
 Real Genius (1985) with Val Kilmer
 Sneakers (1992) with Robert Redford
 Clueless (1995) with Alicia Silverstone
 Kicking and Screaming (1995) with Josh Hamilton
 Don't Be a Menace to South Central While Drinking Your Juice in the Hood (1996) with the Wayans Brothers
 Boys and Girls (2000) with Freddie Prinze Jr.
 Jurassic Park III (2001) with Sam Neill
 Orange County (2002) with Colin Hanks and Jack Black
 House of the Dead 2: Dead Aim (2005) with Sticky Fingaz
 The Holiday (2006) with Cameron Diaz, Kate Winslet, Jude Law, and Jack Black
 Made of Honor (2008) with Patrick Dempsey and Michelle Monaghan
 Fired Up (2009) with Nicholas D'Agosto, Eric Christian Olsen, and Sarah Roemer
Table for Three (2009) with Brandon Routh, Jesse Bradford and, Sophia Bush
 The Kids Are All Right (2010) with Annette Bening and Julianne Moore
The Face of Love (2013) with Annette Bening, Ed Harris, and Robin Williams

TV credits include:

 Agents of S.H.I.E.L.D.
 Arrested Development
 Awkward
 Beverly Hills, 90210 
California's Gold
 Cannon 
 Charmed 
 Criminal Minds
CSI
 Dragnet 
Eli Stone
Glee
 Greek
 The Good Place
Here and Now
HGTV Star
King of the Nerds
Law and Order: Los Angeles
Lethal Weapon 
 Lou Grant
Major Crimes
 Modern Family
 Monk 
 NCIS
 Parenthood
Ray Donovan
 Remington Steele
The Riches
 Rizzoli & Isles
The Romanoffs
Rome
Snowfall
Sweet/Vicious
 Switched at Birth
 The L Word 
 The Man from U.N.C.L.E
The Sex Lives of College Girls
 The West Wing
Training Day
True Blood
Welcome to the Family

See also

References

Further reading

External links

Official website

 
Occidental
Eagle Rock, Los Angeles
Liberal arts colleges in California
Private universities and colleges in California
Educational institutions established in 1887
1887 establishments in California
Northeast Los Angeles
San Rafael Hills
Schools accredited by the Western Association of Schools and Colleges